Wayland Academy may refer to:

Wayland Academy, Watton, a secondary school in Watton, Norfolk, England
Wayland Academy, Wisconsin, a private college preparatory school in Beaver Dam, Wisconsin, USA

See also
Wayland (disambiguation)